Nataša Đorđević is a Serbian pop-folk singer. Her first album was released by PGP-RTS in 1994. Today, she is one of the most successful artists of the Grand Production. She has released many duets with famous Serbian singers, and together with Suzana Jovanović provided a backing vocal for Stoja, another popular Serbian pop-folk singer .

Discography 

Ti si otrov moj (1990)
Hej djavole (1991)
Kad tad (1992)
Avanturista (1994)
Prevara (1995)
Kletva (1997)
Da umrem od tuge (1999)
Alal vera (2000)
Zaboravi broj (2001)
Bas Bas (2002)
Ne daj me srećo (2003)
Neoprostivo (2006)
Nataša Đorđević (2012)

References

1974 births
Living people
Singers from Belgrade
Serbian folk-pop singers
20th-century Serbian women singers
Grand Production artists
21st-century Serbian women singers